2014 Ürümqi attack may refer to either of two attacks in the Chinese city of Ürümqi, Xinjiang:

 April 2014 Ürümqi attack
 May 2014 Ürümqi attack